Energy of the Daleks is an audio drama based on the long-running British science fiction television series Doctor Who. This audio drama was produced by Big Finish Productions.

Plot
The scene is set in London 2025. An energy crisis persists and The GlobeSphere Corporation plans to alleviate it with solar panels on the moon and a satellite dish on top of the National Gallery. The Doctor has detected an even more incongruous energy in the vicinity.

Cast
The Doctor – Tom Baker
Leela – Louise Jameson
Damien Stephens – Alex Lowe
Jack Coulson – Mark Benton
Lydia Harding – Caroline Keiff
Kevin Winston – Dan Starkey
Robomen – John Dorney / Alex Lowe / Dan Starkey
Daleks – Nicholas Briggs

Continuity
The Daleks converted humans into electronically controlled mind-slaves called "Robomen" in their second television story, The Dalek Invasion of Earth in 1964.

Notes
This is Tom Baker's first Dalek story since 1979's Destiny of the Daleks.  He also faced them in 1975's Genesis of the Daleks.
Mark Benton played Clive in the first episode of the revived Doctor Who television series, Rose, in 2005.
Dan Starkey has played Sontarans in several recent Doctor Who television stories, such as The Sontaran Stratagem and A Good Man Goes to War.
Although the fourth in this series, Energy of the Daleks was the first story Tom Baker recorded with Big Finish Productions.  The recording took place on 22 April 2011.

Critical reception
Paul Mount, writing for Starburst, gave the story 7/10, describing it as a "cracking little romp".

References

External links
Energy of the Daleks

Fourth Doctor audio plays
Dalek audio plays
Audio plays by Nicholas Briggs